G. Ramachandhran (7 October 1904 – 17 January 1995) was a soldier for the Gandhian cause, social reformer and a teacher. With his wife, Dr. T. S. Soundram, daughter of T V Sundaram Iyengar, founder of TVS Group, he started the Gandhigram, Tamil Nadu in 1945. He authored several books. Viswabharati, Rabindranath Tagore's University, in Santhiniketan awarded him the higher title "Desikottama" ('The Best teacher').

After severing various cadres before and after the Independence of India he returned to his native hometown Neyyattinkara, Kerala, and started his last venture "The Madhavimandiram Loka Seva Trust" for the welfare of women and children in 1980. During the year 1991 he started a public school at Neyyatinkara. The name of the school is Dr GR Public school, it is affiliated to C.B.S.E. The present strength of the school is more than 2000 with classes from LKG to XII.

He was an MP and Health and Education Minister in Pattom Thanu Pillai's Ministry in Kerala. He was the chairman of All India Khadi Village Industries Commission (KVIC). He was the founder and first vice-chancellor of Gandhigram Rural University.

Sri G. Ramachandran met Gandhi at Dilkush in 1921, during Gandhiji's famous "21 days fast". He was then a student of Mr. CF Andrews at Santiniketan. The discussions GR was privileged to have with Gandhi on the occasion drew him closer to the Mahatma. Ramachandran soon became an inmate of Gandhiji's ashram at Sevagram and under Gandhiji's direct guidance and supervision plunged himself into the national movement and the Gandhian Constructive Programme. During the Freedom struggle, he courted arrest eleven times and spent seven years in jail. Gandhi chose him as a close disciple and entrusted to him several important missions. He was sent to Jamia Millia Islamia as per the request of Dr Zakhir Hussain where he served a lecturer and taught spinning. Khadi work brought him closer to the common man and the distinguished Rajaji. He began Khadi work selling Khadi yarn and cotton and became the Chairman of All India Khadi and Village Industries Commission of India. During his tenure as chairman, he started the People's Education Programme for poor.

His contribution to education, Basic Education & Higher Education, Khadi and community Development, needs special mention. Gandhigram Rural University of which he became the Founder Vice chancellor is a reflection on GR as an educationist and a constructive thinker. His experiments in Gandhigram showed us how rural children and women could be provided with facilities for growth and all-round development from birth to higher education. Along with his wife, Dr (Mrs.) Soundram Ramachandran, he founded the "Institute of Rural health and Family planning Centre"‚ institute for 'Sanitary Inspectors' Training and Kasturba Hospital, which won recognition and awards at the National level (especially for services in Family planning and women & child-welfare).

He was a powerful Orator and a brilliant writer. His autobiography, "Adventuring with life" is a true reflection of his times and the aspirations of the millions who dedicated their lives for their motherland.

Biography/milestones
The milestones in the eventful life of this multifaceted personality and man of conviction and humor are numerous. He joined the Non Cooperation movement in 1920 & participated in the Tilak Swaraj Fund. Around the same time or a year later, he met "the dear, revered Kumarji at the Travancore District Congress Conference in Chertalai" and began promoting Khadi living with him in Trivandrum. This lasted for several years.  Ramachandran became one of the earliest Honors Graduates of the Visva Bharati in 1924 and joined the Sabarmathi Ashram. After college he took part in the Salt-Satyagraha Revolution in 1930 together with Rajaji at Vedaranyam. He was sentenced to imprisonment for one year and a fine of 500 rupees. He also functioned as the Provincial Secretary of the Harijan Sevak Sangh in Tamil Nadu and Kerala and member of the Central Executive Committee of Harijan Sevak Sangh. Ramachandran took active part in the Temple Entry movement in Tamilnad and Kerala (Vaikom). As decided by Harijan Sevak Sangh, he toured around Travncore with M. Govindan, K.G. Kunjukrishna Pillai, V. Achutha Menon and others collecting signatures of "Savarna Hindus" in favour of the entry of "Avarnars" to temples which complemented the exceptional work carried out by the Valiya Rajah of Ennakkadu, K. Kumar and Pandavath Sankara Pillai in Travancore in favour of temple entry and communal harmony[**]. He later spent six years as one of the general Secretaries of the Hindustani Tamil Sangh in Sevagram and actively promoted Basic Education in Tamil Nadu, Mysore and Andra. He was later appointed the Chairman of the Basic Education Assessment Committee set up by the Government of India. He was even appointed educational advisor of Rajaji Government of Madras State and joined the Pattom Tanu Pillai Cabinet (in Travancore) as a Minister. He served the Indian Express as an Editor. Along with his wife Dr (Mrs.) Soundram Ramachandran founded Gandhigram in 1947 and was its Director for 15 years. He also served as a member of the Rajya Sabha for 6 years. He served on the Bal with Ray G Mehta Committee on Community Development. He was the general secretary of Gandhi Smark Nidhi for 3 years. He was even the Founder Secretary of the Gandhi Peace Foundation, and editor of Gandhi Marg (English Journal). He conferred the degree of D.Litt. by the Kashi Vidya Peeth, title of "Desikottama" by Viswabarathi University and Doctorate by Gandhigram Rural University. He traveled the world and lectured in the universities in England, Germany, United States, Soviet Union, Poland, Yugoslavia, Ceylon etc. spreading the message of Mahatma Gandhi. He was a member of the delegation sent to Moscow by the Gandhi Peace foundation along with the Congress President UN Debar to take the message of peace and to prevent the use of Nuclear weapons. He was an author and wrote Thought and Talks, Village Reconstruction Step by Step, The Man Gandhi, A Sheaf of Gandhi Anecdotes, Higher Values of Life, Adventuring with Life and more titles. He was an advocate of world peace and received peace awards from Grambling University, US, and the Soka Gakkai International, Tokyo. As a last venture Ramachandran founded the Madhavimandiram Loka Seva Trust, at the age of 76, bequeathing all his ancestral property (to the Trust) in memory of his mother Smt Madhavi Tankachi.

G Ramachandran's niece Saraswati Thankachi married, Dr. Kanthilal Gandhi – Mahatma Gandhi's grandson.

References

External links
 Outlook Article on GR
 Gandhigram
 School in the Name of GR's mother

1904 births
1995 deaths
20th-century Indian journalists
Gandhians
Nominated members of the Rajya Sabha
Indian social reformers
Journalists from Tamil Nadu
Indian independence activists from Tamil Nadu